Unmarried Mothers (Swedish: Ogift fader sökes) is a 1953 Swedish drama film directed by Hans Dahlin and Bengt Logardt and starring Eva Stiberg, Logardt, Öllegård Wellton and Lennart Lindberg. It was shot at the Centrumateljéerna Studios in Stockholm with location shooting around Vaxholm. The film's sets were designed by the art director Bibi Lindström.

Cast
 Eva Stiberg as 	Irene Lindblad
 Bengt Logardt as 	Dr. Stig Hellgren
 Öllegård Wellton as 	Inga Lind
 Lennart Lindberg as 	Gösta Hedengran
 Lissi Alandh as 	Sippi
 Erik Strandmark as 	Ned
 Anne-Margrethe Björlin as 	Ann-Margreth Söderberg
 Per Sjöstrand as 	Erik Eliasson
 Gunlög Hagberg as 	Rut Jonsson
 Ulla Smidje as Ann-Marie Andersson
 Ulla Holmberg as 	Eva Waller
 Gerd Ericsson as 	Mary Ellinder 
 Märta Dorff as 	Mrs. Berglund
 Hans Dahlin as 	Arne Bergström
 Gull Natorp as Elna, Inga's Supervisor
 Eivor Engelbrektsson as 	Marie Wallin 
 Mona Geijer-Falkner as Nurse 
 Gösta Gustafson as 	Mr. Olsson 
 Sven Holmberg as Drunk 
 Ragnvi Lindbladh as 	Adoptive Parent
 Aurore Palmgren as 	Stepmother 
 Lasse Sarri as 	Tore 
 Hanny Schedin as 	Miss Lindblad
 Rune Stylander as Doctor

References

Bibliography 
 Stevenson, Jack. Scandinavian Blue: The Erotic Cinema of Sweden and Denmark in the 1960s and 1970s. McFarland, 2010.

External links 
 

1953 films
Swedish drama films
1953 drama films
1950s Swedish-language films
Films directed by Hans Dahlin
Films directed by Bengt Logardt
Swedish black-and-white films
1950s Swedish films